The Keld Resource Centre  is a charity based in the small village of Keld in Upper Swaledale, North Yorkshire.  It is restoring a series of listed buildings in the village, and returning them to a range of community uses.

Completed projects
The Manse - the former Minister's house adjoining Keld United Reformed Church was refurbished in 2009.  It is now available to let as a holiday cottage.  Proceeds from lettings are used to fund the Centre's future projects.

The Well-being Garden - a patch of unkempt land in the chapel churchyard has been turned into a quiet, meditative garden from which visitors can contemplate their inner well-being amidst the beautiful natural scenery of Upper Swaledale.

The Countryside and Heritage Centre - a former stables has now become a small visitor and interpretation centre, was opened on 14 May 2011, providing information about the countryside and local community.  There is a display of historical items relevant to Upper Swaledale curated by the Swaledale Museum in Reeth.  The centre is open all year.

Future projects
The Resource Centre is developing plans to restore three further historic buildings: the former School, Literary Institute and Methodist Chapel.

References

Swaledale
Charities based in North Yorkshire